Antonio II may refer to:

 Antonio II da Montefeltro (1348–1404)
 Antonio II Acciaioli, Duke of Athens from 1439 to 1445